José Dias may refer to

People
José Dias Coelho (1923–1961), Portuguese artist and sculptor
José Dias de Melo (1925–2008), Portuguese author
José Dias Ferreira (1837–1909), Prime Minister of Portugal, 1892–93
José Simões Dias (1844–1899), Portuguese poet, short-story writer and literary critic
Jose Antonio Dias, Angolan minister for geology and mines

Places
Coronel José Dias, Brazil

Ships
, a Soviet cargo ship in service 1946-66

Dias, Jose